Nadine Koppehel (born 1977) is a German politician of the Alternative for Germany (AfD) party. She has been a member of the state parliament of Saxony-Anhalt since 2021.

Koppehel is an office clerk. She was office manager and financial accountant in the offices of AfD member of parliament Andreas Mrosek in Berlin, Dessau-Roßlau and Gräfenhainichen. According to herself, she became a member of AfD in 2015. She was elected to the city council of Oranienbaum-Wörlitz and then of Wittenberg in 2019. At the 2021 Saxony-Anhalt election Koppehel got elected to the Landtag. She is one of two womean in the AfD fraction, consisting of 23 MoP.

She is single and has one child.

References 

1977 births
Living people
Alternative for Germany politicians